The list of ship launches in 1898 includes a chronological list of some ships launched in 1898.


References 

Sources

1898
 
Shi